Bentholebouria is a genus of trematodes in the family Opecoelidae.

Species
Bentholebouria blatta (Bray & Justine, 2009) Andres, Pulis & Overstreet, 2014
Bentholebouria colubrosa Andres, Pulis & Overstreet, 2014
Bentholebouria longisaccula (Yamaguti, 1970) Andres, Pulis & Overstreet, 2014
Bentholebouria rooseveltiae (Yamaguti, 1970) Andres, Pulis & Overstreet, 2014
Bentholebouria ulaula (Yamaguti, 1970) Andres, Pulis & Overstreet, 2014

References

Opecoelidae
Plagiorchiida genera